OSK Holdings Berhad (OSK) is a public company listed on the Main Board of Bursa Malaysia Securities Berhad.  Despite its public-listing status, it is 80.76% owned by individuals with the majority owned by its CEO Ong Leong Huat. OSK has diversified away from its stockbroking business to include investment banking activities which is carried out under its investment bank subsidiary, OSK Investment Bank Berhad.

OSK offers stockbroking services, treasury products, corporate advisory, derivatives and structured products, offshore investment banking, asset management, trustee services, and Islamic banking services.  It recently obtained a commercial banking licence in Cambodia and full-fledged operations should begin soon barring unforeseen circumstances.

Regional Presence
OSK has over 50 offices across Malaysia and has a presence in the following countries:
Singapore
Hong Kong
Shanghai
Indonesia
Cambodia

In April 2008, Bank Negara approved OSK’s plan to set up a commercial bank in Cambodia to undertake commercial banking activities. OSK Indochina Bank Ltd had on October 10, 2008 commenced commercial banking operations in Phnom Penh. The bank offers the full range of retail and commercial banking products and services as well as foreign exchange and capital market expertise.

References
OSK Corporate Profile
Career Website
OSK Businesses

Banks of Malaysia
Investment banks
Companies listed on Bursa Malaysia